Know-It-All is the debut studio album by Canadian singer and songwriter Alessia Cara. It was released on November 13, 2015 through Def Jam Recordings. The album followed the release of her debut extended play (EP) Four Pink Walls (2015), which Cara regarded as a preview of the album. Know-It-All contains the five original songs from  Four Pink Walls as well as five new songs recording for the album.
Cara co-wrote all the tracks and worked closely with Pop & Oak and Sebastian Kole amongst others. The album led Cara to receive the Grammy Award for Best New Artist in 2018.

Writing and recording
Preliminary work on the album began in 2013, with recording taking place in 2014 in New York into 2015. Cara worked with several producers including Kuya, Malay, Alan Nglish, Fredro, Pop & Oak and Sebastian Kole. The latter helped in the conception of the opening track "Seventeen". The song was written when Cara was about eighteen: "It was a whole bunch of feelings. We got to talking in the studio with my dad and Sebastian — we all came up with this thing, like, let’s write about how life goes by really fast. My dad brought up that idea, and that’s why the first line is, ’My daddy says that life comes at you fast’.".

Singles
"Here" was released on April 30, 2015, as the lead single from Cara's extended play (EP) Four Pink Walls. The song became Cara's first top-5 single on the US Billboard Hot 100 chart, upon reaching the peak position of five for the week of January 27, 2016 and Cara performed the song on The Tonight Show with Jimmy Fallon with their house band The Roots. The song received an official video, which was directed by Aaron A.

"Wild Things" was initially released on October 27, 2015 as a promotional single but the song was later sent to US contemporary hit radio on February 2, 2016, as the album's second single, and has since achieved moderate success peaking at number 50 on the Billboard Hot 100.

Cara announced that "Scars to Your Beautiful" would be released as the third single. It was sent to contemporary hit radio on July 26, 2016. It peaked at number 8 on the Billboard Hot 100.

Critical reception

Know-It-All received generally positive reviews from music critics, receiving a 70 out of 100 on the review aggregate website Metacritic based on 13 reviews, indicating "generally favorable reviews". AllMusic reacted positively towards the album, writing "Going by the level of potential shown here, it's evident that Cara will eventually need a lot less creative assistance." Billboard was also positive in its review of the album: "As first impressions go, Know-It-All is a charismatic balance between dreams and reality that makes its author stick out in the most impressive way." Exclaim!'''s, Ryan B. Patrick wrote that "while [Know-It-All] is a tad formulaic, it's terrifically executed and solidly produced...Cara's debut is a striking standout pop record that portends career longevity." Pitchfork Media was more mixed: "Writing from the heart does not automatically imbue lyrics with depth. Never is it more apparent that the factory approach is not allowing Cara to fulfill her potential than on 'Scars to Your Beautiful.'"

Commercial performanceKnow-It-All debuted at number nine on the US Billboard 200 with first week sales of 36,000 equivalent album units (22,000 pure album sales). On May 22, 2017, the album was certified platinum by the Recording Industry Association of America (RIAA) for combined sales and album-equivalent units of over a million units in the United States.

Tour
To promote the album, Cara embarked on her first headlining concert tour, the Know-It-All Tour''. Tickets went on sale and quickly sold-out, with the first leg running from January 15 through April 1, 2016. A second leg was scheduled for September 29 through November 2, 2016.

Track listing

Notes
  signifies a co-producer
 "Seventeen" contains an interpolation of "My Girl" by The Temptations, written by William Robinson, Jr. and Ronald White.
 "Here" contains a sample from "Ike's Rap II", written and performed by Isaac Hayes.

Charts

Weekly charts

Year-end charts

Certifications

Release history

References

2015 debut albums
Alessia Cara albums
Def Jam Recordings albums
Albums produced by Malay (record producer)
Juno Award for Pop Album of the Year albums
Albums produced by Oak Felder